Gianyar Regency is a regency (kabupaten) in the Indonesian province and island of Bali, Indonesia. It has an area of 368.0 km2 and had a population of 469,777 at the 2010 Census, and 515,344 at the 2020 Census, making it the second most densely populated district in Bali (after Badung). Its regency seat is the town of Gianyar.  The civil registry survey of April 2011 listed 480,447 people, of which 469,929 were classified as Hindu.

The town of Ubud, a centre of art and tourism, is located in Gianyar Regency.

Rajas of Gianyar 
 Ida Anak Agung Gde Agung (1921–1999)

Condotels and Apartments ban
Although Badung Regency, Denpasar city and Gianyar Regency are the three richest regions in Bali and most of their wealth comes from tourism, in February 2012 Gianyar Regency officially banned the construction of new and increasingly-popular condominium hotels ("condotels") and apartment facilities. Unlike the Badung Regency and Denpasar, where condotels and apartments remain in high demand for tourist developers and investors, Gianyar Regency wants to protect local entrepreneurs.

Administrative districts
The regency is divided into seven districts (kecamatan), tabulated below with their areas and population totals from the 2010 Census and the 2020 Census. The table also includes the number of administrative villages (rural desa and urban kelurahan) in each district, and its postal codes.

Gianyar Regency's civil registry recorded 480,447 residents by religion, in April 2012, 97.8% Hindu.

Keramas Beach
Keramas Beach in Blahbatuh has hosted international surfing competitions in the last couple of years with limited facilities such as uneven road and no parking lots. On June 18–29, 2013, Keramas Beach was on the Association of Surfing Professionals (ASP)'s 2013 Men's World Champhionship Tour schedule as the Oakley Bali Pro.

Sports

In football, Bali is home to the football club Bali United, which plays in the Liga 1.
The team was relocated from Samarinda, East Kalimantan, to Gianyar, Bali. Harbiansyah Hanafiah, the main commissioner of Bali United, explained that he did the name change and moved the homebase to Bali because there were no representatives from Bali in the highest football tier in Indonesia. Another reason was that local fans in Samarinda prefer to support Pusamania Borneo F.C. more than Persisam.

Climate
Gianyar has a tropical rainforest climate (Af) with moderate to heavy rainfall year-round. The following climate data is for the town of Gianyar.

Education
Yayasan Slukat Learning Center (2007), non-profit foundation and school located in the village of Keramas

References

Further reading 
 Vickers, Adrian (1995), Gianyar Regency. taken from

External links

 

 
Populated places in Bali